Nipissing—Timiskaming is a federal electoral district in Ontario, Canada, that has been represented in the House of Commons of Canada since 2004. The riding was formed by the amalgamation of the former Nipissing riding with the southeastern portion of the former Timiskaming—Cochrane riding.  The 2011 electoral results in this riding were challenged in court on the grounds that there were "irregularities, fraud or corrupt or illegal practices that affected the result of the election".

Nipissing—Timiskaming consists of:
the Territorial District of Nipissing, excluding:
 the Municipality of West Nipissing;
 the southeast part of the district;
 the Town of Kearney;
 in the Territorial District of Parry Sound, the Town of Powassan and the townships of Nipissing and North Himsworth; and
 the part of the Territorial District of Timiskaming lying south and east of a line drawn from the eastern limit of the district west along the northern border of the Townships of Harris, Dymond, Hudson, Lundy, Auld and Speight, south along the western border of the townships of Speight, Van Nostrand, Leo and Medina to the southern limit of the district.

This riding lost small portions of territory to Timmins—James Bay and gained a small portion from Nickel Belt during the 2012 electoral redistribution.

The seat's present federal MP is Anthony Rota, the Speaker of the House.

Demographics
Ethnic groups: 91.8% White, 6.6% Native Canadian 
Languages: 76.7% English, 18.0% French 
Average income: $23,848

Member of Parliament

This riding has elected the following member of the House of Commons of Canada:

Election results

Despite the fact that 99% of this riding stayed the same after the 2012 redistribution, based on the results of the 2011 election — in which Aspin defeated Rota by a margin of just 18 votes — the minor boundary changes were enough to make the seat a notional Liberal riding. The riding lost two Conservative voting areas in the north (Hudson Township and Harris Township) while gaining the Nipissing 10 Indian Reserve, where the Tories finished third.

Note: This vote was subject to mandatory recount because of the margin of win being less than 1/1000 of the total votes.

See also
 List of Canadian federal electoral districts
 Past Canadian electoral districts

References

Riding history from the Library of Parliament
 2011 results from Elections Canada
 Campaign expense data from Elections Canada

Notes

Ontario federal electoral districts
Politics of North Bay, Ontario
Temiskaming Shores